The 21st Santosham Film Awards or also, 21st Santosham South Indian Film Awards was an awards ceremony held at Hyderabad, India on 26 December 2022. The ceremony (21st Santosham Film Awards) recognized the best films and performances from the Tollywood and other Indian language films and music released in 2021 and 2022, along with special honors for lifetime contributions and a few special awards. The awards are annually presented by Santosham magazine.

Honorary awards 

 Lifetime Achievement Award – P. Susheela
 Santosham Allu Ramalingaiah Smaraka Award – Rajendra Prasad
 Santosham NTR Smaraka Award – Krishnaveni, Vanisri, Latha, Roja Ramani, Prabha, Jayamalini, Kutty Padmini, Baby Rani, Kavitha, 
 Santosham Krishnam Raju Smaraka Award – Murali Mohan

Main awards

Presenters

Notes

References 

2022 film awards
2022 Indian film awards
Santosham Film Awards
2022 music awards